Shree Swasthani Bakhan is a Hindu epic originating from Nepal.

It was first written around 1573 by Jayanta Dev in Newari and later gained widespread popularity in the country following its translation into Nepali. Shree Swasthani Bakhan takes place in various areas in Nepal, including Sankhu.

References 

1573 books
Books about spirituality
Hindu texts
Nepalese books
Nepalese religious texts
Nepalese epics